Father's Day is the debut studio album from American hip hop artist Father MC, released in 1990 on Uptown Records and distributed through MCA Records.

Release and reception

While Rob Theakston at Allmusic felt some of the material on the album could be considered formulaic, he acknowledged the importance of the work, stating that "the impact of Father's Day's tone and textures would be felt for years to come."

Track listing

Chart history

Album

Singles

Personnel
Information taken from Allmusic.
arranging – Mark Morales, Mark C. Rooney
art direction – Carol Friedman
design – Patrick Roques
drum programming – Mark Morales
engineering – Fresh Gordon, Franklin Grant, John Pace, Howie Tee, Chuck Valle
executive production – Sean "Puffy" Combs, Andre Harrell
keyboards – Mark C. Rooney
mastering – Jose Rodriguez
mixing – Steven Ett, Fresh Gordon, Howie Tee
performer(s) – Fresh Gordon
photography – Carol Friedman
production – Fresh Gordon, Mark Morales, Mark C. Rooney, Howie Tee
production coordination – Eloise Bryan
programming – Howie Tee
vocals – Father MC
vocals (background) – Mary J. Blige, Dave Hollister, JoJo, K-Ci, Mark C. Rooney

Notes

External links
 
 Father's Day at Discogs

1990 debut albums
Father MC albums
MCA Records albums
Uptown Records albums
Albums produced by Cory Rooney
Father's Day